Soo Bae (born Apr 1977) is a Korean-Canadian cellist who currently lives in New Jersey.

She was born in Seoul, South Korea, and began her cello studies at six years of age. She then moved to Toronto, where she studied at the Royal Conservatory of Music. She continued her cello studies at The Curtis Institute of Music in Philadelphia, where she received her Bachelor of Music in 2001. Bae received her Masters of Music degree and then the Artist Diploma from the Juilliard School.

Bae has won several awards and competitions, most notably the 2006 Canada Council Musical Instrument Bank National Competition. Her first place award is the three-year loan of the (c.1696) Bonjour Stradivarius Cello. Other recent accomplishments are awards from the 2006 Adam International Cello Festival and Competition, New Zealand, and the 2005 Concert Artists Guild International Competition.

Bae founded Angelos Mission Ensemble in 2004, a Christian music academy for students of stringed instruments. The purpose of the Ensemble is to educate and mold future Christian musician leaders. The organization was incorporated in 2006 as a non-profit corporation, and she continues to direct the organization with her husband Jason Suh.

She collaborates with other musicians including with jazz saxophonist Paquito D’Rivera in November 2006. She also formed a trio with fiddle player Mark O'Connor and pianist Soyeon Lee in 2006. She co-founded a duo, "Walk 132", with her pianist and guitarist husband.

External links 
 Soo Bae

Living people
1977 births
South Korean classical cellists
South Korean emigrants to Canada
Canadian musicians of Korean descent
Juilliard School alumni
The Royal Conservatory of Music alumni
Canadian women classical cellists
21st-century women musicians
21st-century cellists